The Empire of Dracula is a 1967 Mexican horror mystery thriller film directed by Federico Curiel and starring Lucha Villa, César del Campo and Eric del Castillo.

It was influenced by Hammer Horror films. It is one of several vampire movies made in Mexico in the 1960s, alongside Miguel Morayta's duology The Bloody Vampire (1962) and The Invasion of the Vampires (1963).

Plot
A man searches for the vampire who killed his father to prevent him from coming back to life, but to do so he must fight his army of beautiful female vampires, who lure men to their estate so they can feed on their blood.

Cast
Lucha Villa as Patricia
César del Campo as Luis Brener
Eric del Castillo as Baron Draculstein (as Erick del Castillo)
Ethel Carrillo as Diana
Guillermo Zetina as Dr. Wilson.
Robin Joyce as Lily
Fernando Osés as Igor
Víctor Alcocer as Mr. Brener, Luis's father
Mario Orea as Police Inspector
Rebeca Iturbide as Mrs. Brener, Luis's mother
Altia Michel as María, maid (as Atilia Michel)
José Dupeyrón as Chauffeur

Reception
In El gran libro del vampiro ("The great book of the vampire"), Alexis Puig said, "There is a lot of eroticism, especially lesbian: female vampires biting female victims;" and highlighted a scene in which the count must fight inside his own coffin with a man carrying a crucifix as a "very dramatic scene."

References

External links

1967 films
1960s Spanish-language films
1967 horror films
1960s horror thriller films
1960s mystery thriller films
Mexican horror thriller films
Mexican mystery thriller films
Mexican vampire films
1960s Mexican films